Hayley Marsten is an Australian country music singer-songwriter, from originally from Gladstone, Queensland, Australia. She is a touring, recording, multi-award nominated artist. Her debut studio album Spectacular Heartbreak was released in August 2019.

Career

Early life
Hayley grew up in Gladstone, Queensland and later moved to the state's capital, Brisbane to study at Queensland University of Technology and pursue her music career.

2015–2018: Even and Lonestar EP
In 2015, Marsten released her debut extended play, titled Even. Two of the singles reached the top 40 of the Country Tracks Chart. Late in 2015, Marsten was announced as one of the 10 finalists for the 2016 Toyota Star Maker competition.

In May 2017, Marsten released "Until You", the lead single from her second EP, Lonestar. Lonestar was produced by ARIA Award and Golden Guitar winning producer, Matt Fell. The EP debuted at No. 8 on the ARIA Country Albums Chart. The EP spawned three more singles, 'Second Fiddle', 'Money Can't Buy Class' and 'Coming Home'. With 'Coming Home' eventually reaching #1 on the Kix Country Charts.

2019–present:Spectacular Heartbreak
In 2019 Marsten crowdfunded her debut album through Pozible and raised over $17,000. Spectacular Heartbreak was released on 30 August 2019. At the 2020 Country Music Awards of Australia, the album was nominated for 'Alt Country Album of the Year'. It was later nominated for 'Country Work of the Year' at the 2020 Queensland Music Awards. In 2021, she released a digital EP, 'Spectacular' which featured four songs from the album, 'Spectacular Heartbreak', reimagined on piano.

Discography

Albums

Extended plays

Singles

Awards

CMAA Golden Guitars

Queensland Music Awards

References

Living people
Australian country singer-songwriters
People from Gladstone, Queensland
Year of birth missing (living people)